Fanari is a former municipality in the Preveza regional unit, Epirus, Greece. Since the 2011 local government reform it is part of the municipality Parga, of which it is a municipal unit. The municipal unit has an area of 205.893 km2. Population 7,962 (2011). The seat of the municipality was in Kanallaki.

History
The earliest Mycenaean pottery at the site of Ephyra at the mouth of the Acheron river dates to the Late Helladic IIIA (c.1400–c.1300 BC). The site of Ephyra is now located 4 kms from the Ionian coast but in ancient times the coastline extended much farther inland. Fortification at the acropolis of Ephyra include two successive defensive walls in cyclopean masonry and a gate in built similar to the Lion Gate of Mycenae.

In historical times the Necromanteion of Ephyra in Epirus was probably the best known oracle of this kind in Ancient Greece.

A fort is attested in the 14th century (Castellanariam Fanarij) at the Glykys river. In June 1386 the population of Fanari asked for Venetian protection. As such, Marino della Roseaa, a Venetian from Corfu acquired the local fort for 100 ducats probably from its Albanian lord but soon abandoned it because of the frequent raids. Fanari was still in Venetian control in 1395.

Fanari is a mainly agricultural area. Before World War II the local population supported the Liberal Party. An Albanian speaking community was found there also. At recent times local Roma farm workers are Albanian speakers.

Axis occupation atrocities
During the Axis occupation of Greece, operation codenamed "Augustus" was undertaken by Wehrmacht and Cham Albanian militia units in August 1943. This affected the area south of Paramythia as far as Ammoudia and Parga.

This resulted in several local settlements to be burnt to the ground and the murder of civilian population. On 30 September, the Swiss representative of the International Red Cross, Hans-Jakob Bickel, visited the area and concluded:
20,000 Albanians, with Italian and now German support, spread terror to the rest of the population. Only in the region of Fanari 24 villages were destroyed.

In 21 settlements in the vicinity of Kanallaki 400 inhabitants were arrested and forced to march to the nearest concentration camp in Thessaloniki (KZ Pavlos Melas). When the march begun the armed groups did not hesitate to execute a diseased priest in front of the rest of the hostages. The looting and burning in the villages of Fanari lasted for 19 days while c. 800 armed troops of the Cham Albanian militia participated in the atrocities. In exchange of their support, German Lieutenant Colonel Josef Remold offered the Chams weapons and equipment. As a token of appreciation, Nuri Dino, the leader of the Cham security battalions, promised to secure the region of the Acheron river, south of Paramythia, against Allied infiltration. During the subsequent operations, 600 Greek villagers were killed and 70 villages in the region were destroyed. 500 Greek citizens were taken hostages and 160 of them were sent to forced labour in Nazi Germany.

Subdivisions
The municipal unit Fanari is subdivided into the following communities:

Acherousia
Ammoudia
Andonia
Ano Skafidoti
Despotiko
Kanallaki
Kastri
Koroni
Koryfoula
Koukkouli
Kypseli
Loutsa
Mesopotamo
Mouzakaiika
Narkissos
Skepasto
Stavrochori
Themelo
Valanidorachi
Valanidoussa
Vouvopotamos

References

Sources 
 
 

Populated places in Preveza (regional unit)